Mayberry Branch is a stream in Reynolds County in the U.S. state of Missouri. It is a tributary of the Black River.

Mayberry Branch has the name of the local Mayberry family.

See also
List of rivers of Missouri

References

Rivers of Reynolds County, Missouri
Rivers of Missouri
Tributaries of the Black River (Arkansas–Missouri)